Zenneth Arthur Pond (December 7, 1919 – September 10, 1942) was a United States Marine Corps flying ace. He was the first Marine ace to be killed in action during World War II and was a posthumous recipient of the Navy Cross.

Early life and aviation career 
Zenneth A. Pond was born on December 7, 1919, in Jackson, Michigan. Graduating from Jackson High School in 1938, he subsequently attended Jackson Junior College. While in college, he studied aviation through the Civil Aeronautics Administration. Pond earned his private pilot's license in 1940.

Pond enlisted into the Marine Corps in June 1941 and was sent to flight training at Naval Air Station Corpus Christi, Texas. On February 19, 1942, Pond was officially designated a Marine Corps aviator and was ordered to report to the 2nd Marine Aircraft Wing in San Diego, California.

Cactus Air Force ace 
Second Lieutenant Pond was attached to the newly formed Marine Fighting Squadron 223 (VMF-223). On August 2, 1942, Pond's squadron set sail for Guadalcanal aboard the USS Long Island. On August 20, Pond and the rest of his squadron launched from the flight deck of the ship and flew 200 miles to Guadalcanal. Landing in Henderson Field, Pond and his squadron officially became part of the Cactus Air Force.

On August 24, Second Lieutenant Pond scrambled to his plane and took off from the field as the air raid siren sounded. Pond and other Marine pilots intercepted 27 Japanese aircraft attempting to bomb Henderson Field. More than half of the Japanese planes were shot down, with Pond himself scoring victories against two bombers and one fighter.

On August 29, Pond scored his fourth kill, a Zero, but was forced to make an emergency landing when a bullet struck his engine. The next day, Pond claimed his fifth kill and became an ace.

Second Lieutenant Pond was nearly killed a second time on September 5. While shooting down his sixth plane, his aircraft was badly shot up by the Japanese tail gunner, with one bullet grazing Pond's arm. While Pond was returning to Henderson Field, his engine stopped running, yet he was still able to make a deadstick landing.

Death 
Second Lieutenant Pond and three other Marine pilots responded to a Japanese air raid on September 10, 1942. The four pilots, including Major John L. Smith, encountered 46 Japanese aircraft. Pond was shot down and killed, making him the first Marine ace to be killed in action during World War II. He was listed as missing in action and declared dead the next day.

Pond's body was never recovered. For his actions during the Guadalcanal campaign, Pond was posthumously promoted to captain and awarded the Navy Cross.

References 

1919 births
1942 deaths
United States Marine Corps personnel killed in World War II
American World War II flying aces
Aviators from Michigan
Aviators killed by being shot down
Recipients of the Navy Cross (United States)
United States Marine Corps officers
United States Marine Corps pilots of World War II
United States Naval Aviators
Aviators killed in aviation accidents or incidents
Missing in action of World War II
Aerial disappearances of military personnel in action